Karpylivka (or ) — is a village in the Sarny Raion (district) of Rivne Oblast (province) in western Ukraine, center of silrada (rural council) with joint administration (includes settlement Strashiv, village Rudnia-Karpylivska). Its population is 2,276 as of the 2001 Ukrainian Census.

References

Villages in Sarny Raion